Cranbourne may refer to:

Places 
Cranbourne, Victoria, Australia
Cranbourne railway line
Cranbourne railway station
Electoral district of Cranbourne, an electoral district in Victoria, Australia
Saint-Odilon-de-Cranbourne, Quebec, Canada

UK
Cranborne, Dorset, England, UK
Cranborne Chase, Dorset, England, UK
Cranbourne, Berkshire, England, UK
Cranbourne Chase, Berkshire, England, UK
Cranbourne Lodge, a royal lodge, within Cranbourne Chase
Cranbourne, Hampshire, England, UK
Cranbourne Way, Cardiff, Wales, UK

Other
Viscount Cranbourne
Cranbourne School, Hampshire, England, UK
Cranbourne meteorite

See also

 Cranbourne South, Victoria, Australia
 Cranbourne North, Victoria, Australia
 Cranbourne East, Victoria, Australia
 Cranbourne East railway station